Pattaya Piamkum is a former Thai Port FC player and is assistant coach of the Thailand national futsal team.

He played for Thailand national futsal team at the 2000 and 2004 FIFA Futsal World Championships. At the 2000 FIFA Futsal World Championship in Guatemala, Piamkum scored the first goal for Thailand in the history of the World Cup against Uruguay on 20 November 2000.

Following his playing career, he managed the Thailand and Vietnam national futsal teams.

References

1968 births
Living people
Pattaya Piamkum
Pattaya Piamkum
Futsal coaches
Thailand national futsal team managers
Association football midfielders
Pattaya Piamkum